Orris oil (orris butter or Beurre d'Iris) is an essential oil derived from irises, particularly Iris germanica. It is sometimes used as a flavoring agent and as an ingredient in perfume production. It can also have uses in body lotions.

Storage and use
The rhizomes (roots) must be stored in a cool, dry location for three years to develop the scent. The fresh rhizomes are almost odorless.
 
The distilled oil solidifies in the receiver as a wax-like and cream-colored mass known as orris concrete. It is solid because of the high content of myristic acid (85%), a white stearin-like substance. 

Orris concrete melts when it reaches around body temperature. It has a woody, fatty-oily, yet distinctly violet-like odor: sweet floral, warm & tenacious with a fruity undertone. Orris concrete is used in perfumery when the presence of myristic acid is not prohibitive, e.g.: in soap perfumes where the weak acid only acts as a fixative. The methyl and ethyl esters of myristic acid are often used for blending in violet type perfume bases. The high costs of orris oil production limit its application.

References 

Essential oils